Under the Antioquian Sky (Spanish: Bajo el cielo antioqueño) is a 1925 Colombian silent film directed by Arturo Acevedo Vallarino.

Plot

Romantic drama of manners. Lina, graceful schoolgirl, argues against the will of his father, Don Bernardo, a romance with Alvaro, a young bohemian who squanders his fortune. They decide to escape from parental supervision, but in the train station a beggar hurt Lina warns about the serious error being committed. He bandages the wound with a tissue in which are inscribed his initials and she gratefully gives him her jewels and in turn tells her boyfriend's decision not to pursue this adventure. The beggar is assaulted and murdered. His body appears with the handkerchief Alvaro, who is accused of the crime. Although he is innocent silent to protect Lina and this, above his honor, confesses the truth. Alvaro, and innocent, is gold and ends happily married to Lina.

Cast
 Alicia Arango de Mejía as Lina
 Gonzalo Mejía Trujillo as Don Bernardo
 Juan B. Naranjo as Álvaro
 Harold Maynham as Mister Adams
 Rosa Jaramillo as Mendiga
 Carlos Ochoa as Puntillas
 Eduardo Uribe as Bandido
 José Ignacio González as Detective
 Carlos Botero as Cura
 Ángela Henao as Campesina
 Berta Hernández as Señorita
 Lía Restrepo as Adela
 Jorge Restrepo as Carlos

External links
 

1925 films
Colombian silent films
1925 romantic drama films
Colombian black-and-white films
Colombian drama films
Silent drama films